Alfonso Capecelatro (Marseille, 5 February 1824 – 14 November 1912) was an Italian Archbishop of Capua, ecclesiastical writer, Vatican librarian, and Cardinal.

Life

He was descended from the family of the dukes of Castelpagano. His father served under General Murat, adopted the political principles of the Napoleonic period, and voluntarily exiled himself to Malta and Marseilles, when Ferdinand of Naples, after his restoration by the Congress of Laibach, set about the repression of political Liberalism.

The family returned to Italy in 1826 and to Naples in 1830. At sixteen Alfonso entered the Oratory of St. Philip Neri at Naples. Ordained priest in 1847, he devoted himself to the confessional, preaching, and various charitable enterprises, but also to ecclesiastical studies, giving especial attention to ecclesiastical history. He was particularly drawn to Peter Damian, Catherine of Siena, Philip Neri, and Alphonsus Liguori, 
whose biographies he wrote.

He attacked Ernest Renan's "Life of Christ", then widely circulated in Italy, and afterwards himself published a "Life of Jesus Christ". He devoted three volumes to an exposition of Catholic doctrine and two to the Christian virtues, and published several volumes of sermons.

Meanwhile, he maintained personal relations with various persons, particularly priests and religious at Naples, among them the Franciscan Ludovico da Casoria, whose biography he wrote, and two priests Persico and Casanova, with whom he often discussed methods of catechetical instruction. He corresponded with other Liberal Catholics, among them Manzoni, Cesare Cantu, Dupanloup, and Montalembert. Pope Leo XIII summoned him to Rome, together with Luigi Tosti, and made him assistant librarian, wishing thereby not only to honour a learned man, but also to make use of him for the work of reconciliation which occupied his mind until 1887.

In 1880 Capecelatro was appointed Archbishop of Capua. There he passed his life in the administration of his diocese, literary labours, and works of charity. He was made a cardinal by Leo XIII in 1885. He received some votes in the papal conclave, 1903.

In the pastoral letters and other minor works published in the last years of his life he treats the great questions of modern times, especially those relating to public life in Italy. He had little influence in ecclesiastical politics, and in the end was overwhelmed by the course of events in the modernist crisis in the Catholic Church.

References

1824 births
1912 deaths
Bishops of Capua
19th-century Italian Roman Catholic archbishops
20th-century Italian Roman Catholic archbishops
Archbishops of Capua
19th-century Italian cardinals
Cardinals created by Pope Leo XIII
20th-century Italian cardinals